David K. Dill (July 7, 1955 – August 8, 2015) was an American politician and member of the Minnesota House of Representatives. A member of the Minnesota Democratic–Farmer–Labor Party, he represented District 3A in northeastern Minnesota. He was also a consultant, a commercial pilot and an aircraft and power plant mechanic.

Early life and career
Dill graduated from Southport High School in Indianapolis, Indiana, then attended Indiana University Bloomington. He served as city administrator for Orr, Minnesota for 11 years prior to being elected to the Minnesota House of Representatives.

Minnesota House of Representatives
Dill was first elected to the Minnesota House of Representatives in 2002 and re-elected every two years until his death in 2015. He served as chairman of the Iron Range Legislative Delegation during the 2005–2006 biennium.

Personal life
During the summer months, Dill spent time in northwestern Ontario tending to his business, Thunderhook Fly-Ins.

Dill was diagnosed with Type 2 diabetes in his early 20s. He later acknowledged that he did not look after his health, allowing his weight to surpass 300 pounds. In 2008, Dill underwent gastric bypass surgery, losing more than 150 pounds. As a result of diabetic nephropathy, Dill eventually had only 15% renal function and needed to go on dialysis or have a kidney transplant. He was hoping for a transplant from his sister. Dill announced that he nevertheless intended to run for re-election. On October 12, 2010, he received a kidney transplant at Hennepin County Medical Center in Minneapolis. The transplant was successful. He later had a pacemaker installed to treat an irregular heartbeat.

Death
Dill was hospitalized at the Mayo Clinic in mid-July 2015 to undergo chemotherapy. He died on August 8, 2015, of cancer at the age of 60 at Camp Thunderhook in Armstrong, Ontario.

A funeral service was held on August 15 at the Backus Community Center in International Falls, Minnesota.

References

External links

 Rep. David Dill official Minnesota House of Representatives website
 Vote Smart – Rep. David Dill Profile

1955 births
2015 deaths
Politicians from Indianapolis
People from St. Louis County, Minnesota
Indiana University Bloomington alumni
Democratic Party members of the Minnesota House of Representatives
Kidney transplant recipients
Deaths from cancer in Minnesota
Deaths from kidney cancer
21st-century American politicians
Commercial aviators